Johan Penttilä (2 March 1891 – 23 February 1967) was a Finnish wrestler. He competed in the freestyle middleweight event at the 1924 Summer Olympics.

References

External links
 

1891 births
1967 deaths
People from Seinäjoki
People from Vaasa Province (Grand Duchy of Finland)
Olympic wrestlers of Finland
Wrestlers at the 1924 Summer Olympics
Finnish male sport wrestlers
Sportspeople from South Ostrobothnia